Nigel Kellett (born 18 December 1969) is a former Australian rules footballer for  in the Australian Football League (AFL).

Playing career
He played 101 matches for the Bulldogs before leaving the AFL after the 1997 AFL season.

References

External links
 
 

Living people
1969 births
Western Bulldogs players
Australian rules footballers from Victoria (Australia)
People educated at Geelong College